Alta is an unincorporated community on the northwest border of Peoria in Peoria County, Illinois, United States. The decommissioned Illinois State Route 174 runs through Alta, and the Rock Island Trail begins in Alta.

History
Alta was laid out in 1873 when the railroad was extended to that point. The community was so named on account of its lofty elevation. A post office was established at Alta in 1873, and remained in operation until the 1970s

References

Unincorporated communities in Peoria County, Illinois
Unincorporated communities in Illinois
Peoria metropolitan area, Illinois